This is a discography for contemporary gospel singer Andraé Crouch.

Albums

Andraé Crouch & The Disciples

Solo

Compilations
1975: The Best of Andrae Crouch & the Disciples (Light)
1981: More of the Best... (Light)
1983: Let's Worship Him (Arrival)
1986: Autograph (Light)
1990: His Best (Arrival)
1991: Volume 1, The Classics (Light)
1991: Volume 2, We Sing Praises (Light)
1991: Volume 3, Contemporary Man (Light)
1995: The Light Years (Light)
1999: Hall of Fame (CGI)
2002: Legends Of Gospel (Light)
2002: Mega 3 Collection Vol. 1 & 2 (Light)
2003: History Makers (Sparrow Records)
2003: Kings of Gospel Andrae Crouch/Walter Hawkins (Universal Special Products)
2004: He's Everywhere (Liquid 8)
2005: The Definitive Greatest Hits (Compendia Music Group)
2005: The Very Best of Andrae Crouch (Lynor)
2006: I Got Jesus (St. Clair)
2008: Platinum Praise Collection (Light)

Appearances on other albums
1968: Teen Challenge Addicts Choir Sherman Andrus, Andraé Crouch, Ruben Fernandez, Laura Lee Myers, Gale Stalhman, Gordon Woods (Word Records)
1977: Whole New Thing; Billy Preston (A&M Records)
1979: Heavenly Love; The Boones; "Because I Love Him" (Lamb & Lion)
1982: He Set My Life to Music; Barbara Mandrell (MCA Records) "Through it All"
1985: The Color Purple original motion picture soundtrack (Qwest Records) (piano, organ)
1985: Mathematics; Melissa Manchester (MCA)
1985: We're Waiting; Sandra Crouch (Light)
1987: Bad; Michael Jackson (Epic Records)
1988: As Good as It Gets; Deniece Williams (Columbia Records)
1988: From Langley Park to Memphis; Prefab Sprout (Epic)
1988: Non Stop; Julio Iglesias (Columbia)
1988: Back on the Block; Quincy Jones (Qwest)
1989: Like a Prayer; Madonna (Sire)
1990: Lady with a Song; Nancy Wilson (Columbia)
1991: Curtis Stigers; Curtis Stigers (Arista Records)
1991: Dangerous; Michael Jackson (Epic)
1991: Force Behind the Power; Diana Ross (Motown Records)
1991: Free; Rick Astley (RCA Records) "Cry for Help" (choir vocal arrangement)
1991: Handel's Messiah: A Soulful Celebration; various artists (Warner Alliance)
1992: With All of My Heart; Sandra Crouch (Sparrow)
1993: Duets; Elton John (MCA)
1993: Once Upon a Forest; James Horner (Fox) "He's Back"
1994: The Lion King original soundtrack (Walt Disney Records)
1994: The Christmas Album; David Foster (Interscope)
1995: HIStory: Past, Present and Future, Book I; Michael Jackson (Epic)
1996: Donnie McClurkin; Donnie McClurkin (Warner Alliance)
1996: Love Brought Me Back; Helen Baylor (Sony)
1996: A Time to Kill original soundtrack (Silver Sounds)
1996: Tribute: The Songs of Andrae Crouch; various artists (Warner Bros.) "My Tribute (To God Be the Glory)"
1997: Live In Paris; Oslo Gospel Choir (featuring Andrae Crouch and Kristle Murden) (Norske Gram)
1997: Blood on the Dance Floor: History in the Mix; Michael Jackson (Epic)
1996: Vestal & Friends; Vestal Goodman (Pamplin Music) "You're Able"
2000: It Ain't Nothin' But the Blues original Broadway cast album (MCA)
2001: Invincible; Michael Jackson (Epic)
2005: Glory Train: The Lost Sessions; Pat Boone (Oak Records) "Thank You Billy Graham"
2005: Now Is the Time; Anointed (Sony) "Jesus Is Lord"
2007: Instrument of Praise; Carman (Tyscot)
2008: The Sound; Mary Mary (Columbia)

Video
1991: The All-Star Gospel Session (HBO)
2004: Hallelujah Gospel
2005: First Love: A Historic Gathering of Jesus Music Pioneers
2008: Thank You, Billy Graham

Gaither Homecoming performances
1999: Kennedy Center Homecoming "Soon And Very Soon", "The Blood Will Never Lose Its Power"
2001: A Billy Graham Music Homecoming Volume Two "Through It All / Can't Nobody Do Me Like Jesus / Soon And Very Soon medley"
2002: God Bless America "If It Had Not Been"
2008: Rock Of Ages "Through It All"

Notes

References

Discographies of American artists
Christian music discographies